Alexandra Dowling (born 1990), is an English actress best known for her lead role as Queen Anne in the BBC One historical action drama series The Musketeers, which is based on the characters in The Three Musketeers by Alexandre Dumas. She is also known for her guest starring role as Roslin Frey in HBO's Game of Thrones.

Early life
In 2012, Dowling graduated from Oxford School of Drama with a Diploma in Professional Acting.

Career
In 2012, Dowling made her television debut in "The Drawing of the Dark", the eleventh episode of the final series of the BBC fantasy drama series Merlin, as a druid girl named Kara. She also appeared in the music video for "Love Is All I Got" by Feed Me and Crystal Fighters.

Dowling guest starred in "The Rains of Castamere", the ninth episode of the third season of HBO's fantasy television series Game of Thrones as Roslin Frey. She also starred in "Elephants Can Remember" in the thirteenth series of ITV's Agatha Christie's Poirot, adapted from Agatha Christie's novel of the same name. This episode was aired on 9 June 2013, and also starred Zoë Wanamaker, Vanessa Kirby and David Suchet.

Dowling played the female lead Agnes in the epic action film Hammer of the Gods, also starring James Cosmo. The film is directed by Farren Blackburn and was released on 5 July 2013. The film tells the story of a dying Viking king who sends his son on a quest to seek out his older brother, the clan's only hope for defeating an approaching enemy horde.

She is known for her role as Queen Anne in the BBC One drama series The Musketeers, based on Alexandre Dumas's novel The Three Musketeers, about French political intrigues in the early 17th century.

Dowling portrayed Bertha in Joshua Stamp-Simon's stage adaption of St. John Emile Clavering Hankin's The Last of the De Mullins, which opened at Jermyn Street Theatre, London on 5 February and ended on 28 February 2015.

Filmography

References

External links

Living people
Alumni of the Oxford School of Drama
English television actresses
21st-century English actresses
Place of birth missing (living people)
1990 births